1976 Emperor's Cup Final was the 56th final of the Emperor's Cup competition. The final was played at National Stadium in Tokyo on January 1, 1977. Furukawa Electric won the championship.

Overview
Furukawa Electric won their 4th title, by defeating Yanmar Diesel 4–1. Furukawa Electric was featured a squad consisting of Choei Sato, Shigemi Ishii, Eijun Kiyokumo, Kozo Arai, Takashi Kuwahara, Yoshikazu Nagai and Yasuhiko Okudera.

Match details

See also
1976 Emperor's Cup

References

Emperor's Cup
1976 in Japanese football
JEF United Chiba matches
Cerezo Osaka matches